Montreux One is a live album by jazz saxophonist Archie Shepp recorded at the Montreux Jazz Festival in 1975 and released on the Arista Freedom label.

Reception 
The Allmusic review by Scott Yanow states "Shepp, who was nearing the end of his free jazz period (soon he would be exploring hymns and traditional melodies) puts a lot of emotion into "Lush Life" and sounds fine on originals by Burrell and Greenlee in addition to his own "U-jamsa." [sic] A worthy effort".

Track listing 
 "Lush Life" (Billy Strayhorn) - 12:40
 "U-Jamaa" (Archie Shepp) - 10:22
 "Crucificado" (Dave Burrell) - 11:43
 "Miss Toni" (Charles Greenlee) - 11:57
 Recorded at the Montreux Jazz Festival, Switzerland, July 18, 1975

Personnel 
 Archie Shepp - tenor saxophone
 Charles Greenlee - trombone
 Dave Burrell - piano
 Cameron Brown - bass
 Beaver Harris - drums

References 

1976 live albums
Archie Shepp live albums
Freedom Records live albums
albums produced by Michael Cuscuna
albums recorded at the Montreux Jazz Festival